Jefferson Pessanha Agostinho (born 13 March 2000), known simply as Kibe, is a Brazilian professional footballer who plays for Portuguese club Canelas 2010 on loan from Marítimo as a forward.

Professional career
Kibe made his professional debut with Marítimo in a 1-0 Primeira Liga loss to Vitória S.C. on 19 July 2020.

References

External links

CSM Profile
Liga Portugal Profile

2000 births
Footballers from Rio de Janeiro (city)
Living people
Brazilian footballers
Association football forwards
C.S. Marítimo players
Primeira Liga players
Campeonato de Portugal (league) players
Brazilian expatriate footballers
Brazilian expatriate sportspeople in Portugal
Expatriate footballers in Portugal